The John Miley Maphis House is a historic home located near Edinburg, Shenandoah County, Virginia. It was built in 1856, and is a frame, two-story, gable-roofed, "L"-shaped, vernacular Italianate style dwelling. The interior features unusual, boldly scaled, grain painted, late-Greek Revival interior woodwork. Also on the property are the contributing frame bank barn with forebay (c. 1870), a one-story frame wash house with gable roof and forebay (c. 1900), and a shed roofed, frame chicken house with horizontal- and vertical-board siding (c. 1920).

It was listed on the National Register of Historic Places in 2011.

References

Houses on the National Register of Historic Places in Virginia
Houses completed in 1856
Italianate architecture in Virginia
Greek Revival houses in Virginia
Houses in Shenandoah County, Virginia
National Register of Historic Places in Shenandoah County, Virginia